Montevergine may refer to:

 , an inhabited place in Mercogliano
 Montevergine, massif in Campania, Italy; location of the Territorial Abbey of Montevergine
 Montevergine funicular, funicular railway that connects the town of Mercogliano with the mountain and catholic sanctuary of Montevergine
 Territorial Abbey of Montevergine, chief house of the Order of Monte Vergine
 Order of Monte Vergine, a Catholic monastic order